Badsworth is a village and civil parish in the City of Wakefield metropolitan borough in West Yorkshire, England. According to the 2001 census it had a population of 583, increasing to 682 at the 2011 Census.

The name "Badsworth" has its roots in Old English and means "Enclosure of a man called Bæddi". The first element is the person's name Bæddi; the second is the word worth, meaning an enclosure, or enclosed farmstead or settlement. The village was recorded as Badesuuorde in the Domesday Book of 1086.

See also
Listed buildings in Badsworth

References

External links
 
 

Villages in West Yorkshire
Geography of the City of Wakefield
Civil parishes in West Yorkshire